"Goodbye Mama (I'm off to Yokohama)" is a World War II song written and composed by J. Fred Coots. The wartime song was first published in 1941 by Chappell and Co. in New York, NY.  The song has a march-tempo, 4/4 meter with some syncopated rhythm. The tune is cheery and akin to a Boy Scout hiking song.

The sheet music can be found at the Pritzker Military Museum & Library.

References

Bibliography 
Cooper, B. Lee, and Wayne S. Haney. 1999. Rock music in American popular culture III, III. Rock Music in American Popular Culture. New York: Haworth Press. . 
Jasen, David A. 1988. Tin Pan Alley: the composers, the songs, the performers, and their times: the golden age of American popular music from 1886 to 1956. New York: D.I. Fine.. 
Jones, John Bush. 2006. The songs that fought the war: popular music and the home front: 1939-1945. Hanover: Univ. Press of New England. . 
Smith, Kathleen E. R. God Bless America: Tin Pan Alley Goes to War. Lexington, KY: University Press of Kentucky, 2003. Print. . 
Zinsser, William. 2006. Easy to remember: the great American songwriters and their songs. Jaffrey, N.H.: David R. Godine. . 

1941 songs
Songs of World War II
Songs with music by John Frederick Coots